Kosob is a rural locality (a selo) and the administrative center of Kosobsky Selsoviet, Tlyaratinsky District, Republic of Dagestan, Russia. The population was 244 as of 2010. There are 5 streets.

Geography 
Kosob is located 22 km north of Tlyarata (the district's administrative centre) by road. Busutli is the nearest rural locality.

References 

Rural localities in Tlyaratinsky District